Bahamasair Holdings Limited is an airline headquartered in Nassau. It is the national airline of The Bahamas and operates scheduled services to 32 domestic and regional destinations in the Caribbean and the United States from its base at Lynden Pindling International Airport.

History

Early years
Bahamasair was established by the Bahamas Government and started operations on 17 June 1973 by acquiring the routes of Flamingo Airlines and the operations and routes of Out Island Airways. The first flight was to Andros Island and the second to Freeport, Grand Bahama. The Bahamas Government purchased 51% of OIA and became the majority shareholder and part owner, then renamed the airline Bahamasair. The other owners were Edward Albury, Gil Hensler and Sherlock Hackley who had 49%. After a few years the Government had purchased the shares of Gil Hensler and Sherlock Hackley. The only Bahamian owner of OIA still maintaining some shares was Edward Albury.

Bahamasair initially encountered operating difficulties, including poor maintenance facilities, economic conditions and company structure. Those factors brought public distrust as a consequential added problem. However, jet airliners started to arrive in the shape of new BAC One-Eleven twin jets including the stretched series 500 model, followed by one brand new Boeing 737-200, and in 1973, it opened its first service to the US, from Nassau to Tampa, Florida.

Also in 1973, the government's vision of several airlines discontinuing service to Nassau became a reality, when US carrier Pan American World Airways as well as other airlines decided to stop operating to the Bahamas. This enabled Bahamasair to capture a substantial part of the Bahamas scheduled air transport market.

Through the rest of the 1970s, Bahamasair kept adding flights to other cities in Florida and, domestically, the presence of the airline also grew rapidly. According to the February 1, 1976 Official Airline Guide (OAG), interisland flights were operated with Fairchild Hiller FH-227 and STOL capable de Havilland Canada DHC-6 Twin Otter turboprops and also with one Douglas DC-3 prop aircraft. This same OAG also lists four daily round trip flights between Nassau and Freeport operated by Bahamasair with BAC One-Eleven twin jets.

1980s 

During the early 1980s, Bahamasair unsuccessfully tried to expand to the Northeast United States, opening flights to Philadelphia, Washington, D.C. and Newark, New Jersey. But in 1989, the airline's directors decided that those routes were not profitable and eliminated them from the airline's schedule. Also in 1989, the first of two Boeing 727-200s came into the fleet. That was also the year that a new livery and workers' uniform were introduced. The Boeing 727s, however, could not be kept in service long because of political favors and interference, thereby causing the company to lose vast sums of money in the late 1980s and early 1990s.

1990s 
In 1991, de Havilland Canada Dash 8 turboprop aircraft were purchased to replace the whole jet fleet and the Boeing 737-200s were taken out of service. According to the September 15, 1994 Official Airline Guide (OAG), most flights were being operated with Dash 8 turboprops although Short 360 turboprops and Cessna 402 prop aircraft were being operated in scheduled service as well. The Dash 8 was being flown on all scheduled services between the Bahamas and Florida at this time according to this OAG. In 1997, the Boeing 737s returned to service because key routes warranted the cargo and passenger carrying capabilities offered by these jetliners. The 737-200 was deployed to Fort Lauderdale, Miami and Orlando as well as one domestic route, being Nassau-Freeport.

Development since the 2000s

In November 2011, the government discussed plans to replace the Bahamasair Boeing 737-200s with more fuel efficient and cost effective aircraft. However, it was said that pre-owned 
Boeing 737-500s may serve as a replacement for the then current jet fleet. In 2012, Bahamasair confirmed it would be taking delivery of two Boeing 737-500s with a 120-passenger all-economy class layout. The first aircraft was delivered on 30 March 2012 and put into service in April 2012. The second 737-500 was delivered on 21 June 2012. Bahamasair retired its last two Boeing 737-200s in September 2012 and received a third Boeing 737-500 in March 2014.

In May 2015, it was reported that the loss-making airline was in a phase of restructuring to gain profitability as advised by the government. This included new union agreements as well as a planned renewal of the ageing fleet. Shortly after, Bahamasair ordered five new ATR 42 and ATR 72 aircraft to replace all of its Bombardier Dash 8s.

The airline took delivery of the first ATR 72–600 on 27 November 2015.

Destinations

Fleet

Current fleet

As of October 2022, the Bahamasair fleet consists of the following aircraft:

Historic fleet

Accidents and incidents
As of 2022, Bahamasair has not suffered a fatal accident since its founding in 1973. However, three aircraft have been lost in non-fatal accidents and a weather event:

 On 14 March 2017, an ATR 72-600 sustained substantial damage after being struck by a violent tornado at Nassau-Lynden Pindling International Airport, Bahamas. The left hand main landing gear collapsed.
 On 20 April 2007, a Bombardier Dash 8-300 suffered a failure of the left main gear while landing at Governor's Harbour Airport, causing the aircraft to skid on the runway until coming to a halt. The aircraft was damaged beyond repair and written off. None of the 48 passengers and 3 crew members were harmed.
 On 12 October 1998, a Hawker Siddeley HS 748 was damaged beyond repair by Hurricane Mitch while resting on the apron in Nassau.
 On 31 July 1978, a Fairchild Hiller FH-227 impacted the runway of Chub Cay International Airport seconds after take-off with its gear already retracted. It skidded on the runway and came to a halt, but was damaged beyond repair. There were no fatalities.

References

External links

 
 https://www.flightglobal.com/news/articles/bahamasair-to-acquire-737-700-from-aercap-449427/

1973 establishments in the Bahamas
Airlines established in 1973
Airlines of the Bahamas
Bahamian brands
Government-owned airlines
Nassau, Bahamas